Andrew Derek Bara Kiwomya (born 1 October 1967) is an English former professional footballer who played as both a left winger and a striker. 
Kiwomya was notably employed by Huddersfield Town as head performance coach in 2010 in this role Huddersfield went on to achieve a 43-game unbeaten run.

Early life
Andy attended St Bede's Grammar School in Heaton, Bradford. He played for the school football team in the Bradford Metropolitan District Schools' Football Association (BMDSFA) league, scoring 10 goals (possibly more as 7 goals are unaccounted for) in the 1982/83 season.

Playing career
Born in Huddersfield, Kiwomya played League football in England and Scotland for Barnsley, Sheffield Wednesday, Dundee, Rotherham United, Halifax Town, Scunthorpe United, Bradford City, Luton Town, Burnley and Notts County.

He later played non-League football for Cambridge City, Nuneaton Town, Boston United, Ilkeston Town and Stocksbridge Park Steels.

Coaching career
Kiwomya was announced as manager of Sheffield FC in May 2015, succeeding Jordan Broadbent. He stepped down from the managerial role in March 2016, becoming head of youth development.

In April 2019, Kiwomya joined EFL Championship side Leeds United as a coach for their Development Hub for elite player development scholarship.

In December 2021 he became head of club performance at Bradford City, having held previous similar roles at Manchester City and Nottingham Forest. Bradford City manager Derek Adams said he believed Kiwomya's appointment would help improve the team's performances. He left Bradford City in July 2022.

Personal and later life
His son is Alex Kiwomya and his brother is Chris Kiwomya.

He is of Ugandan heritage.

Kiwomya has spoken out publicly about the racist elements of the sport.

In November 2007, Kiwomya took part in a charity match, playing for a Sheffield FC Masters XI against a team of soap stars.

References

1967 births
Living people
Footballers from Huddersfield
English footballers
Barnsley F.C. players
Sheffield Wednesday F.C. players
Dundee F.C. players
Rotherham United F.C. players
Halifax Town A.F.C. players
Scunthorpe United F.C. players
Bradford City A.F.C. players
Luton Town F.C. players
Burnley F.C. players
Notts County F.C. players
Cambridge City F.C. players
Nuneaton Borough F.C. players
Boston United F.C. players
Ilkeston Town F.C. (1945) players
Stocksbridge Park Steels F.C. players
English Football League players
Scottish Football League players
English people of Ugandan descent
Association football wingers
Leeds United F.C. non-playing staff
Sheffield F.C. managers
English football managers
Bradford City A.F.C. non-playing staff
Manchester City F.C. non-playing staff
Nottingham Forest F.C. non-playing staff